Ilona Biacsi (born 29 December 1985) is a Hungarian Paralympic athlete competing mainly in category T20 middle-distance events. Biacsi competed at the 2012 Summer Paralympics in London, winning a bronze medal in the women's 1,500m race in her classification. She also won the European Championship title in the 1,500 metres in 2014 in Swansea. Biacsi's twin sister, Bernadett is also a T20 middle-distance athlete and the two were chosen to be joint flag bearers for Hungary at the opening ceremony of the 2012 Summer Paralympics.

Notes

External links
 

Paralympic athletes of Hungary
Athletes (track and field) at the 2012 Summer Paralympics
Athletes (track and field) at the 2016 Summer Paralympics
Paralympic bronze medalists for Hungary
Paralympic silver medalists for Hungary
Living people
Hungarian female middle-distance runners
1985 births
People from Szeged
Medalists at the 2012 Summer Paralympics
Medalists at the 2016 Summer Paralympics
Paralympic medalists in athletics (track and field)
Athletes (track and field) at the 2020 Summer Paralympics